The Dacia Solenza was a subcompact/supermini liftback automobile produced by Romanian auto manufacturer Dacia. It was the last model on Dacia's own platform, but was one of the first models to benefit from Dacia's takeover by the French company Renault.

History

The Dacia Solenza was a small liftback produced from 2003 to 2005. It was a reshaped version of the Dacia SupeRNova, which in turn was an improved version of the Dacia Nova. Production of the Solenza ceased in 2005, when Dacia Logan was introduced.

The Solenza was initially developed in five versions, depending on its features: Europa, Confort, Rapsodie, Clima and Scala. The top version was Scala, which included air conditioning, power steering, alloy wheels, driver airbag, electric windows, a CD player and many other features known for the first time on a Dacia car. The air conditioning was not available with the diesel engine because they were not compatible, so the top version for the diesel range was designated Avantage. A no frills version called Europa was introduced in 2004, lacking window tint, painted bumpers, side moldings or tachometer. The car shared engines, gearbox and several interior parts with the second generation Renault Clio. It was released with a 1.4-litre petrol and a 1.9-litre Diesel engine.

Engines

Gallery

See also
Dacia SuperNova
Dacia Nova

References

External links

Dacia Solenza at AutomobileRomanesti.ro

Solenza
Cars of Romania
Front-wheel-drive vehicles
Subcompact cars
Euro NCAP superminis
Hatchbacks
Cars introduced in 2003